Leroy Lawrence (June 22, 1908 – November 17, 1997) was a Vermont farmer, businessman and politician who served as Speaker of the Vermont House of Representatives.

Biography
Leroy Eugene Lawrence was born in Arlington, Vermont on June 22, 1908 and was raised in Sunderland.  He attended Clarkson University and became a farmer.

A Republican, in 1934 Lawrence was elected to the Vermont House of Representatives and served one term, 1935 to 1937.

Lawrence later moved to Stamford, where he continued to farm.  He served as President of the Bennington County Farm Bureau, and also held local offices including Town Meeting Moderator and Selectman.

In 1956 Lawrence was again elected to the Vermont House, serving four terms, 1957 to 1965.  He was Speaker of the House in his third term, 1961 to 1963.

After leaving the legislature Lawrence converted his Stamford farm, developing homes and turning part of the property into a golf course, the Stamford Valley Golf Club.

Lawrence died in Bennington on November 17, 1997.  He was cremated.

References 

1908 births
1997 deaths
People from Arlington, Vermont
Speakers of the Vermont House of Representatives
Republican Party members of the Vermont House of Representatives
20th-century American politicians